Salomon (Sam) de Wolff (13 August 1878, Sneek – 24 November 1960, Amsterdam) was a Dutch economist and politician.

External sources
Salomon de Wolff at historici.nl (in Dutch)

1878 births
1960 deaths
Dutch communists
Dutch economists
Dutch Jews
Jewish Dutch politicians
People from Sneek
Social Democratic Workers' Party (Netherlands) politicians
Dutch Zionists